Marupiara castanea is a species of beetle in the family Cerambycidae, and the only species in the genus Marupiara. It was described by Martins and Galileo in 2006.

References

Cerambycinae
Beetles described in 2006
Monotypic beetle genera